Vasilyevsky Municipal Okrug is a municipal okrug in Vasileostrovsky District, one of the eighty-one low-level municipal divisions  of the federal city of St. Petersburg, Russia. As of the 2010 Census, its population was 32,236, down from 32,793 recorded during the 2002 Census.

Until May 2008 it was known as Municipal Okrug #8. In 2020 this district was one of the locations (along with Ostankino Tower, RKA Mission Control Center, Twitter headquarters in San Francisco, and at least one Aeroflot flight) that were the subject of a bioterrorism threat posted by group of hackers including those with names of "Thomas Little Evil Utoyo", "Calton", "David Law", "Thanthom", "Hendy", "Gideon W", "Audentis", "Mister Eriee O", "Khengwin", "T-Zehang", "曾家顺", "Mr Castaigne", "kkkwan", "ronxi", "KC LING", "Le3p0ryuen", "Jayrulo", "S Teoh", "Ian Chew", "Mr Yiliang", "W. somboonsuk", "S Patcharaphon", "Victor pang", "jiangxin", "文_祥!", "Freddyisf0xy", "Masami", "Greg Galloway", "EncoreOngKai", "Alteredd State", "Dig Dejected", Elmo Chong" and "Krully" onto various websites and Twitter feeds.

References

Notes

Sources

Vasileostrovsky District